Karina Content is the pseudonym of Karina Schaapman (born 6 June 1960 in Leiden), a Dutch writer and politician affiliated with the Labour Party (Netherlands).

In 2005 Amma Asante (also a councilor for the Labour Party (Netherlands)) and Content, wrote a report, "Het onzichtbare zichtbaar gemaakt" (Making the Invisible Visible). Schaapman had once been a prostitute and was getting information about the influx of organized crime and violence into Prostitution in the Netherlands. Other reports came out around the same time. They concluded that a large number of prostitutes in Amsterdam were being forced to work and were being abused by pimps and criminal gangs, and that the goals of legalization were failing.

Publications

 Schoolstrijd (2000)
 Zonder moeder ("Without Mother", autobiographical, 2004)
 Het onzichtbare zichtbaar gemaakt ("Making the invisible visible", report, 2005)
 Hoerenlopen is niet normaal ("Visiting whores is not normal", pamphlet, 2007)
 Het Muizenhuis - Sam & Julia ("The Mouse Mansion - Sam & Julia", 2011)
 Het Muizenhuis - Sam & Julia in het theater ("The Mouse Mansion - Sam & Julia in the theater", 2012)
 Het Muizenhuis - Sam & Julia het grote feest ("The Mouse Mansion - Sam & Julia and the big party", 2013) This book was a gift for the royal princesses of the Netherlands when Willem-Alexander of the Netherlands was crowned king. 30,000 children in Amsterdam also received this gift for the inauguration.
 Het Muizenhuis - Sam & Julia in het circus ("The Mouse Mansion - Sam & Julia in the circus", 2013)

See also
List of Dutch politicians

References

1960 births
Living people
Dutch women in politics
Labour Party (Netherlands) politicians
People from Leiden